Marco Antonio Andino Flores (25 April 1955 – 9 August 2015) was a Honduran politician and lawyer. He served as deputy of the National Congress of Honduras representing the Liberal Party of Honduras for Francisco Morazán.

Andino was born in San Buenaventura, Francisco Morazán Department. He served as mayor of Tegucigalpa from 2002 to 2006. While serving as Deputy, he earned a law degree from the Universidad Nacional Autónoma de Honduras (UNAH). He was married and had three children.

Andino suffered from diabetes and hypertension, and died at home of cardiac arrest.

References

1955 births
2015 deaths
20th-century Honduran lawyers
Deputies of the National Congress of Honduras
Liberal Party of Honduras politicians
People from Francisco Morazán Department